The Sun Odyssey 49 is a French sailboat that was designed by Philippe Briand as a cruiser and first built in 2003.

Production
The design was built by Jeanneau in France, starting in 2003, but it is now out of production.

Design
The Sun Odyssey 49 is a recreational keelboat, built predominantly of fiberglass. It has a fractional sloop rig, a slightly raked stem, a reverse transom with steps and a swimming platform, an internally mounted spade-type controlled by dual wheels and a fixed fin keel with a weighted bulb. It displaces  and carries  of ballast.

The boat was also built in a "performance" version for racing with a taller rig and modified keel.

The design has sleeping accommodation for six to eight people with three or four cabin layouts. In the three cabin layout there is a double berth in the bow cabin, whereas in the four cabin layout the bow holds two smaller cabins, each with a double berth. In either arrangement there are two aft cabins with double berths. The main salon has a "U"-shaped settee and a straight settee, around a rectangular table all on the starboard side. The galley is located on the port side amidships. The galley is straight in shape and is equipped with a four-burner stove, an ice box and a double sink. There are two, three or four heads fitted, depending on configuration. A navigation station may be located aft on the starboard side unless replaced by a fourth head.

See also
List of sailing boat types

References

External links

Keelboats
2000s sailboat type designs
Sailing yachts
Sailboat type designs by Philippe Briand
Sailboat types built by Jeanneau